Chand Ki Pariyan is a 2019 Pakistani television serial produced by Abdullah Seja under his production banner "iDream Entertainment". The drama serial is written by Zahid Khan and Sameena Aijaz.

Cast
Maryam Noor as Hina: she is the eldest daughter of Iqbal and Rakshanda, her life turns upside down when she is sold by her father to Jagga.
Rahma Saleem Khan as Beena: middle daughter of Iqbal and Rakshanda. She looks after Mona after death of their mother.
Arisha Razi as Mona: youngest daughter of Iqbal 
Salahuddin Tunio as Iqbal; father of Hina, Beena and Mona. He is a greedy man who has excessive habit of drinking and gambling.
Danial Afzal Khan as Azaad: a kind-hearted business man. While running away from Jagga's evil scheme, he appears as savior for Hina.
Adnan Shah Tipu as Jagga: a rascal, Iqbal owes him money and when he couldn't pay the amount on time, Jagga asks for Hina as payment. 
Vasia Fatima as Reema: she's cousin of Azaad and is in love with him. They're engaged to each other.
Feroz Kadri as Rafay: a kind and caring man. He was supposed to get married to Hina but Jagga kidnapped her.
Yasmeen Haq as Farah: Rafay's younger sister 
Syed Fazal Hussain as Moiz: Rafay's younger brother
Ismat Zaidi as Rakshanda: wife of Iqbal, mother of Hina, Beena and Mona, a hard-working woman. She single-handedly raised her daughters and supported her family financially.
Parveen Akbar as Daadu: Azaad's grand mother
Sabiha Hashmi as Rahat: Rafay, Noreen and Moiz's mother
Shazia Qaiser as Nasreen: Azaad's mother
Syed Saim Ali as Jawad: Reema's accomplice in her scheme against Hina
Adeel Abbas as Adnan: Farah's Husband
Waqas Khan as Waheed: Mona's fiance

Broadcast
In Pakistan, serial aired on ARY Digital airing half hourly episodes quarterly (Monday to Thursday) at 7:00 PM. However, after 12 episodes, it started airing hourly episodes on bi-weekly basis (Monday and Tuesday).  In UK, it aired on ARY Family where it emerged as a success.

References

External Links

2019 Pakistani television series debuts
2019 Pakistani television series endings